Zahed Kola or Zahed Kala or Zehed Kola may refer to:
 Zahed Kola, Babol
 Zahed Kola, Fereydunkenar
 Zahed Kola, Qaem Shahr